Eldon Hazlet State Recreation Area  is an Illinois state park on  in Clinton County, Illinois, United States.

References

State parks of Illinois
Protected areas of Clinton County, Illinois